"Try" is a song by Canadian singer-songwriter Nelly Furtado, taken from her second studio album, Folklore (2003). The song, written by Furtado herself, and Brian West, was released as the second single from the album in February 2004. The song was moderately successful in several European countries, including Italy, the Netherlands, and the United Kingdom, where it reached the top 20. It did not chart on the US Billboard Hot 100, but it did peak at number 29 on the Adult Top 40 chart.

Lyrically, Furtado said the song "is about the reality of love. My energy used to just go everywhere, but now I'm more grounded because I've found true love. The idea here is that, yeah, sometimes life sucks. But life is only so long, and somebody can come along who makes you want to be a better person. You just have to roll with the punches. So "Try" is not a happy-go-lucky song. It has a strange arrangement because the chorus happens only twice, and the end is improvisational. It's like one of those epic power ballads." The Los Angeles Times said of "Try", "Her unfettered enthusiasm wins out as she sings of passion for life".

Commercial release
Although the single was a success in some European countries, it did not chart in the United States. "Try" was the last single released from Folklore in the US; the subsequent singles were released only in Canada, Europe and Latin America. Two versions of the song exist; the original with the chorus only occurring twice, and a radio edit version in which the improv is taken out at the end and an extra chorus is added.  A Spanish version, "Dar", was released in 2007 in the album of Loose (Summer Edition) only available in Latin America.

Music video
The music video was directed by Sophie Muller. The music video features Nelly Furtado and a male actor (who is assumed to be her husband) in traditional Portuguese dress, around the Settler time period. It shows their various hardships, and in one scene, Furtado is seen tying lover's knots to the underside of the couple's bedsprings, which is assumed to be an infertility cure from folklore. There is an alternate version of the video, that shows Furtado singing the song with a guitar near the sea.

Track listings
UK CD single

European CD and German mini-CD single

Australian maxi-CD single

Credits and personnel
Credits are lifted from the Folklore album booklet.

Studios
 Recorded at 4th Street Recording (Santa Monica, California)
 Mastered at Bernie Grundman Mastering (Hollywood, California)

Personnel

 Nelly Furtado – writing, lead and background vocals, production
 Brian West – writing, engineering
 Track & Field – production, programming
 Field – intro guitar
 James Bryan – acoustic and electric guitars
 Mike Elizondo – bass
 Alex Alessandroni – piano, echo harmonium
 Joey Waronker – drums
 Russ Miller – drums
 Bob Leatherbarrow – vibraphone
 Lil' Jaz – scratching
 Brad Haehnel – mixing, engineering
 Joe Labatto – engineering
 Neil Couser – engineering assistance
 Brian "Big Bass" Gardner – mastering

Charts

Weekly charts

Year-end charts

Certifications

Release history

References

2004 singles
Music videos directed by Sophie Muller
Nelly Furtado songs
Songs written by Nelly Furtado
Songs written by Brian West (musician)
2003 songs
DreamWorks Records singles
Interscope Records singles